Gary Jardine (born ca. 1977) is a Scottish former football player and current manager of Lowland Football League club Civil Service Strollers.

He was previously manager of Edinburgh City from 2010 until 2017, winning promotion to the Scottish Professional Football League in 2016. He previously played for the club, as well as Armadale Thistle.

Playing career
Jardine played junior football for Armadale Thistle. He joined Edinburgh City in 2004, but shortly afterwards his playing career was curtailed at the age of 26 when he broke his ankle in a friendly match against a Manchester United XI.

Management career
Jardine became Edinburgh City manager in 2010, initially jointly with John Green. At the end of the 2015–16 season, Jardine guided Edinburgh City into the Scottish Professional Football League after defeating East Stirlingshire over two-legs, making Edinburgh City the first club to be promoted to Scottish League Two through the SPFL's play-off system which was introduced for the 2014–15 season. After a difficult start to the club's second season in the SPFL, Jardine resigned from his position on 30 September 2017, after a 3–0 loss left the side ninth in the league.

In December 2017, Jardine was assisting Civil Service Strollers manager Alex Cunningham by taking training sessions. Cunningham said in February 2018 that Jardine would become the team manager at the end of the season.

On 23 May 2018, Jardine was appointed new manager of Civil Service Strollers.

Honours
Edinburgh City
 Lowland Football League (2) : 2014–15, 2015–16
 East of Scotland League Cup: 2012–13
 Scottish League Two play-offs: 2015–16

Managerial statistics

 Stats starting from 2014 to 2015 season.

References

External links

Living people
Scottish football managers
Scottish footballers
Scottish Professional Football League managers
F.C. Edinburgh managers
Date of birth unknown
Place of birth missing (living people)
1970s births
Scottish Junior Football Association players
Armadale Thistle F.C. players
F.C. Edinburgh players
Association footballers not categorized by position
Lowland Football League managers